Kostandovo is a small town in the Pazardzhik Province, southern Bulgaria. In 2010, it had 4342 inhabitants. It gained its town status in 2005. It is located in the Rhodope Mountains close to the Batak Dam and the town of Rakitovo.

References

Populated places in Pazardzhik Province
Towns in Bulgaria
Cities and towns in the Rhodopes